Ivana Troha (born ) is a retired Croatian female volleyball player. She was part of the Croatia women's national volleyball team.

she participated at the 1998 FIVB Volleyball Women's World Championship in Japan.

References

1980 births
Living people
Croatian women's volleyball players
Place of birth missing (living people)